Eugenijus may refer to:

Eugenijus Gentvilas (born 1960), Lithuanian politician
Eugenijus Riabovas (born 1951), Lithuanian football manager 
Eugenijus Karpavičius (1953–2010), Lithuanian illustrator
Eugenijus Maldeikis (born 1958),  Lithuanian politician
Eugenijus Petrovas (born 1936),  Lithuanian politician
Eugenijus Kazimieras Jovaiša (born 1940),  Lithuanian fashion artist
Eugenijus Mindaugas Budrys (1925–2007),  Lithuanian painter 

Lithuanian masculine given names